Norma Nichols (January 7, 1894 – November 27, 1989) was an American silent film actress. She appeared in 42 films between 1914 and 1922. She appeared in several of Larry Semon's films. She was the sister of actress Marguerite Nichols who married actor, director, and producer Hal Roach.

Biography

Norma Nichols was born on January 7, 1894, in Santa Ana, California. She had major roles in films including The Ne'er-Do-Well (1916), Ham and the Hermit's Daughter (1916) and The Tides of Barnegat (1917). She died on November 27, 1989, in Los Angeles, California.

Partial filmography
 Dough and Dynamite (1914)
 The Property Man (1914)
 Fatty's Jonah Day (1914)
 Fatty's Tintype Tangle (1915)
 The Ne'er-Do-Well (1916)
 Ham and the Hermit's Daughter (1916) 
 The Tides of Barnegat (1917)
 The Legion of Death (1918)
 The Rent Collector (1921)
 The Bakery (1921)
 The Bell Hop (1921), extant
 The Fall Guy (1921)
 The Call of Home (1922)

References

External links

1989 deaths
1894 births
20th-century American actresses
American film actresses